Nesochoris brachystigma is a species of moth of the family Tortricidae. It is found in Chile in the Juan Fernandez Islands.

The wingspan is 14 mm. The ground colour of the forewings is grey and the hindwings are fuscous, somewhat paler basally.

References

Moths described in 1965
Euliini
Endemic fauna of Chile